The Alabama State Department of Education (ALSDE) is the state education agency of Alabama. It is headquartered at 50 North Ripley Street in Montgomery. The department was formed by the Alabama Legislature in 1854. The department serves over 740,000 students in 136 school systems.

Eric G. Mackey, Ed.D. was appointed as Alabama State Superintendent in May 2018 and is the current agency head.

State Superintendents of Education
Noah B. Cloud was Alabama's first state superintendent of public education. He served after the American Civil War during the Reconstruction era and later served in the Alabama House of Representatives. He was a doctor.

See also
Alabama State Board of Education

References

External links
 

1854 establishments in Alabama
Public education in Alabama
Education
State departments of education of the United States
Educational organizations based in Alabama
Government agencies established in 1854
Organizations based in Montgomery, Alabama